Metallomics is a monthly peer-reviewed scientific journal covering the growing research field of metallomics. The journal's scope is aimed at "elucidating the identification, distribution, dynamics, role and impact of metals and metalloids in biological systems". It is published by the Royal Society of Chemistry. The executive editor is Jeanne Andres, while the current chair of the editorial board is David Giedroc at Indiana University Bloomington.

Abstracting and indexing 
The journal is abstracted and indexed in:
 Chemical Abstracts Service/CASSI
 PubMed/MEDLINE
 Science Citation Index
 Scopus
According to the Journal Citation Reports, the journal has a 2020 impact factor of 4.526.

References

External links 

 

Chemistry journals
Biology journals
Royal Society of Chemistry academic journals
Publications established in 2009
English-language journals
Monthly journals